Wisam Saadoon Fenjan (born November 21, 1990) is an Iraqi professional footballer who currently plays for Naft Maysan in the Iraqi Premier League.

International debut
On November 20, 2018 Wissam Saedon made his first international cap with Iraq against Bolivia in a friendly match.

Honours

Individual 
 2017–18 Iraqi Premier League top-scorer (24 goals)

References

External links
 

Iraqi footballers
1990 births
Living people
People from Maysan Governorate
Iraq international footballers
Association football midfielders
Naft Maysan FC players